"Bad Memories" is a song by Italian production trio Meduza and British record producer James Carter, featuring American singer Elley Duhé and German duo Fast Boy. It was made available for digital download and streaming by Island Records and Universal Music Group on 22 July 2022; on the same date, the latter label also sent the song to Italian radio stations.

Charts

Weekly charts

Monthly charts

Year-end charts

Certifications

Release history

References

2022 songs
2022 singles
Meduza (producers) songs
Number-one singles in Poland
Island Records singles